Kitson Kapiriel (born December 10, 1993) is a sprinter from the Federated States of Micronesia. He competed at the 2016 Summer Olympics in the men's 100 metres race; his time of 11.42 seconds in the preliminary round did not qualify him for the first round.

References

External links
 

1993 births
Living people
Federated States of Micronesia male sprinters
Olympic track and field athletes of the Federated States of Micronesia
Athletes (track and field) at the 2016 Summer Olympics